Two Mothers is a 1921 Czechoslovak romantic drama film directed by Přemysl Pražský. The film is considered lost.

Cast
Helena Friedlová
Marta Májová
Jiří Myron
Theodor Pištěk
Růžena Šlemrová
Marie Ptáková
Přemysl Pražský
Béda Pražský

References

External links
 

1921 films
1921 romantic drama films
Czechoslovak black-and-white films
Czech silent films
Czechoslovak romantic drama films
Czech romantic drama films
Silent romantic drama films